Botswana competed at the 2019 African Games held from 19 to 31 August 2019 in Rabat, Morocco. In total, 103 athletes represented Botswana at the games. Athletes representing Botswana won five gold medals, three silver medals and six bronze medals and the country finished in 13th place in the medal table.

Medal summary

Medal table 

|  style="text-align:left; width:78%; vertical-align:top;"|

|  style="text-align:left; width:22%; vertical-align:top;"|

Athletics 

Nijel Amos and Isaac Makwala were scheduled to compete at the 2019 African Games. Amantle Montsho will also represent Botswana in athletics.

Leungo Scotch won the men's 400 metres event and Galefele Moroko won the women's 400 metres event.

Boxing 

Nine athletes were scheduled to compete in boxing.

Boxers representing Botswana won two gold medals and one silver medal and the country finished 2nd in the boxing medal table.

Chess 

Botswana is scheduled to compete in chess. Four chess players are scheduled to compete: Phemelo Khetho, Providence Oatlhotse, Onkemetse Linda Francis and Refilwe Tsutsu Gabatshwana.

Cycling 

Botswana competed in events in both road cycling and mountain bike cycling.

Judo 

Thato Lebang, Tirelo Lekoko, Edwin Sello, Letlhogile Tsheko, Gwafila Tema, Happy Taukobong, Victoria Leagajang and Lucky Mabaka will represent Botswana in judo.

Karate 

Botswana competed in karate. In total, athletes representing Botswana won four bronze medals.

Swimming 

Six athletes represented Botswana in swimming.

Men

Women

Mixed

Taekwondo 

Botswana competed in Taekwondo. Two athletes represented Botswana: Karabo Kula and Wardell Ernest Samothsozo. Kula won the bronze medal in the women's –46 kg event.

Tennis 

Denzel Seetso, Mark Nawa, Tshegofatso Tsiang and Ekua Refilwe Youri will represent Botswana in tennis.

Volleyball 

In June 2019 Botswana women's national volleyball team competed in the women's tournament at the 2019 African Games. The men's team was also scheduled to compete but ultimately did not compete.

Weightlifting 

Botswana competed in weightlifting. Four weightlifters represented Botswana: Bokang Alphius Kagiso, Kgotla Alphius Kgaswane, Magdeline Moyengwa and Dikabelo Solomon.

See also 
 Botswana at the African Games

References 

Nations at the 2019 African Games
2019
African Games